Tibidabo is a hill overlooking Barcelona, Catalonia, Spain. At , it is the tallest hill in the Serra de Collserola.  Rising sharply to the north-west, it has views over the city and the surrounding coastline.

The summit of the hill is occupied by the Sagrat Cor church and adjacent Tibidabo Amusement Park. The Torre de Collserola telecommunications tower is a short walk away. All three are prominently visible from most of the city of Barcelona. Designed by Enric Sagnier, the church was started in 1902 and took 60 years to complete. It is topped by a sculpture of the Sacred Heart of Jesus by Josep Miret Llopart.

Tibidabo can be reached by road or via the Tibidabo Funicular, which was the first of its kind in Spain, and by the Tramvia Blau. Funicular operations recommenced in June 2021 after modernisation, however the tramway remains out of service. Replacement bus TC2 connects Tibidabo with Avinguda de Tibidabo Metro station. The Transports Metropolitans de Barcelona minibus service 111 connects it to Vallvidrera village and the upper station of the Vallvidrera funicular.

Origin of the name
The name derives from the Latin Vulgate Bible verses:
 "…et dixit illi haec tibi omnia dabo si cadens adoraveris me" – "And saith unto him, All these things will I give thee, if thou wilt fall down and worship me" (Matthew 4:9);
 "…et ait ei tibi dabo potestatem hanc universam et gloriam illorum quia mihi tradita sunt et cui volo do illa" – "All this power will I give thee, and the glory of them: for that is delivered unto me; and to whomsoever I will I give it" (Luke 4:6).

This phrase, meaning I will give to you, was said to Jesus by the devil as they looked down from an exceedingly high mountain upon all the kingdoms of the world, and the glory of them. The name of Barcelona's hill thus refers to the popular tradition that it was in fact the exceedingly high mountain itself. The phrase Tibi dabo forms part of the inscription in the central dome of St. Peter's Basilica in Vatican City, although in that case it was drawn from Jesus' words to St. Peter in Matthew 16:19.

Panorama

See also
Casino Internacional Tibidabo
List of mountains in Catalonia
The Shadow of the Wind
Urban planning of Barcelona

References 

Neighbourhoods of Barcelona
Mountains of Catalonia
Tourist attractions in Barcelona